Askwith is a ghost town located in Piscataquis County, Maine, United States. Between the towns of Greenville and Rockwood, specifically near Misery Knob, the town had at one time a post office. In 1895 there were no post offices, nor were there express offices; however there was a railroad. Askwith has since been renamed to 'Tarratine' and discontinued as a railroad station. The railroad that once ran through it has been converted into an ATV trail.

External links
  Ghost towns of Maine

Ghost towns in Maine
Populated places in Piscataquis County, Maine